"Where Did We Go Wrong" is a song by American singer Dondria. It is the third single from her debut album Dondria vs. Phatfffat. The song peaked at number 72 on the Billboard Hot R&B/Hip-Hop Songs chart.

Charts

References 

2010 singles
Songs written by Bryan-Michael Cox
Songs written by Jermaine Dupri
2009 songs
So So Def Recordings singles